Alan Hill may refer to:

 Alan Richard Hill (Alan Richard Hill-Walker, 1859–1944), English recipient of the Victoria Cross
 Alan Hill (author) (born 1928), English cricket writer
 Alan Hill (footballer, born 1933) (1933–2010), English professional footballer
 Alan Hill (footballer, born 1943) (born 1943), English professional football goalkeeper 
 Alan Hill (footballer, born 1955) (born 1955), English professional footballer
 Alan Hill (cricketer) (born 1950), English cricketer and umpire
 Al Hill (ice hockey) (Alan Douglas Hill, born 1955), Canadian ice hockey player
 A. Alan Hill (1938–1996), American government official

See also
 Al Hill (disambiguation)
 Allen Hill (scientist) (born 1937)
 Hill (surname)